Heavy Lungs is a British noise rock band based in Bristol.  The band includes drummer George Garratt, guitarist Oliver Southgate, vocalist Danny Nedelko, and bassist James Minchall.

History 
Heavy Lungs formed in Bristol in early 2017 through bassist James Minchall and vocalist Danny Nedelko. Nedelko and Minchall had worked together, and began recording music together, later recruiting local Bristol musicians, Oliver Southgate and George Garratt to round out the band. In 2018, the band released their debut extended play, Abstract Thoughts.

In late 2018, the lead singer became subject of a song of his namesake by fellow Bristol band, IDLES, who released the track "Danny Nedelko" as a lead-single off of their sophomore album, Joy as an Act of Resistance.

In 2019, the band released two EPs: Straight to CD which came out on 14 February 2019. The second EP, Measure was released on 10 October 2019.

Discography

Extended plays 
 Abstract Thoughts (2018)
 Straight to CD (2019)
 Measure (2019)

References

External links 
 

English punk rock groups
English noise rock groups
British hardcore punk groups
Musical groups from Bristol
Musical groups established in 2017
2017 establishments in England
Musical quartets